89.7 Yes The Best (DWYE 89.7 MHz) is an FM station owned and operated by Manila Broadcasting Company through its licensee Cebu Broadcasting Company. Its studios and transmitter are located in 3rd Floor, Lim Bldg., Roxas St., Cauayan, Isabela.

References

External links
Yes The Best Cauayan FB Page
Yes The Best Cauayan Website

Radio stations in Isabela (province)
Radio stations established in 2002